Gest may refer to:

 A type of story or adventure
 Gest (surname)
 GEST Songs of Newfoundland and Labrador popular on-line archive (See Music of Newfoundland and Labrador)
 Gothenburg English Studio Theatre, a professional theatre in Gothenburg, Sweden